Kemijärvi Airfield is an airfield in Kemijärvi, Finland, about  west of Kemijärvi town centre.

See also
List of airports in Finland

References

External links
 VFR Suomi/Finland – Kemijärvi Airfield
 Lentopaikat.net – Kemijärvi Airfield 

Airports in Finland
Airfield
Buildings and structures in Lapland (Finland)